Brian A. Miller is an American television producer and the former Senior Vice President and General Manager of Cartoon Network Studios in Burbank, California, having assumed the title from 2000 to 2021. He was formerly Vice President of Production at Nickelodeon Animation Studio, Vice President of Production at Hanna-Barbera, and Vice President of Production at DIC Entertainment. He served as a production supervisor for 1983's Alvin and the Chipmunks series and was the executive in charge of production for various shows in the 1990s and early 2000s such as Dexter's Laboratory, Hey Arnold!, The Angry Beavers, ChalkZone, CatDog, Sonic the Hedgehog, The Powerpuff Girls, Captain Planet and the Planeteers, Adventures of Sonic the Hedgehog, Cow and Chicken, Johnny Bravo, and the first and early second season of SpongeBob SquarePants.

He has overseen the production of many animated series, such as Adventure Time, Chowder, Foster's Home for Imaginary Friends, Regular Show, Dexter's Laboratory, Samurai Jack, Mixels, and Ben 10. He has received 11 Emmy Awards out of 40 nominations.

On January 8, 2021, Miller founded a new animation production studio, Pat and Mike Productions, Inc. Miller serves as both chief executive officer and secretary, while former Cartoon Network Studios partner Jennifer Pelphrey serves as chief operating officer.

On March 19, 2021, Miller left his job at Cartoon Network Studios, as part of a company wide restructuring due to the merger with AT&T.

Personal life
Miller attended California State University in Northridge, Los Angeles, from 1978 to 1982. He has a Bachelor of Arts degree in radio, television, and film.

Accolades

Filmography

References

External links
 

American television producers
Living people
California Institute of the Arts alumni
Place of birth missing (living people)
Year of birth missing (living people)
Cartoon Network executives
Primetime Emmy Award winners
Cartoon Network Studios people
Hanna-Barbera people
Nickelodeon Animation Studio people